The 1911–12 season was the 38th season of competitive football played by Rangers.

Overview
Rangers played a total of 41 competitive matches during the 1911–12 season.

Results
All results are written with Rangers' score first.

Scottish League Division One

Inter City Midweek Football League

Scottish Cup

Appearances

See also
 1911–12 in Scottish football

References

Scottish football championship-winning seasons
Rangers F.C. seasons
Rangers